Fred Daly may refer to:

 Fred Daly (American football), American football player at Yale, head football coach at Williams College (1913–1914)
 Fred Daly (politician) (1912–1995), member of the Australian House of Representatives (1943–1975)
 Fred Daly (golfer) (1911–1990), Northern Irish professional golfer who won The Open Championship of 1947